Özer Türkmen was the head of the army of the TRNC (Turkish Republic of Northern Cyprus). He had served in the Military of Northern Cyprus since its establishment on 27 June 1976, until he left the army on 8 September 1996 at the age of 57. From 27 June 1976 until 23 November 1978, he served as lieutenant colonel in charge of the 9th battalion. From 24 November 1978 until 19 August 1981, he served as colonel and was in charge of the 3rd battalion from 24 November 1978 until 14 March 1980, and in charge of the 1st battalion from 15 March 1980 until 19 August 1981. From 20 August 1981 until 18 February 1985 he served as brigadier general, in charge of the second brigade from 20 August 1981 until 27 September 1983, and head of the first brigade from 28 September 1983 until 18 February 1985. From 19 February 1985 until 8 September 1996 he served as major general and head of the only division in the army of the TRNC.

References

Turkish Cypriot military personnel